Michael Schmidt may refer to:

 Mike Schmidt (born 1949), baseball player
 Michael Q. Schmidt (born 1953), American actor
 Michael Schmidt (poet) (born 1947), poet and scholar
 Michael Schmidt (bowling) (born 1980), Canadian bowling player
 Michael Schmidt (agriculture) (born 1954), Canadian dairy farmer
 Michael B. Schmidt, German singer / rapper known as Smudo
 Michael S. Schmidt (born 1983), correspondent for The New York Times
 Michael Schmidt (footballer) (born 1962), retired German football player
 Michael Schmidt (designer), wardrobing, jewelry and interiors designer
 Michael Schmidt (photographer) (1945–2014), German photographer
 Michael Schmidt Jr. (born 1958), American sport shooter
 Michael Schmidt (pool player) (born 1966), German pool player
 Mike Schmidt (lawyer), American attorney and prosecutor